Albacete Airport  is an airport operated by Aena located about  south of the city of Albacete, the capital of the province of Albacete in Castile-La Mancha, Spain. It shares the runway and some facilities with Los Llanos Air Base, operated by the Spanish Air and Space Force.

The airport is served by road CM-3203. It began operation as a civilian airport on 1 July 2003, after seventy-plus years solely used by the military. The first flight was flown by Hola Airlines to the Balearic Islands. Albacete and Ciudad Real Central Airport are the only public airports in Castilla La Mancha. However, since the closure of Ciudad Real Central Airport and the cessation of scheduled services from Albacete, the region has been left without any scheduled passenger services.

History
Construction started in 1913, but was then quickly stopped, with operations only starting in 1929 after the Spanish Aviation Company (CEA) took up a contract for pilot training. During the Spanish Civil War, the base was used by military rebels, and from 26 July 1936 by the Republicans. On cessations of activities the newly formed Spanish Air Force established the 13th Bomber Squadron, later becoming Ala26. Closed to civil traffic in 1955, in 1965, it reopened to the Albacete Flying Club. In 1962, Ala37 replaced Ala26, equipped with the Douglas DC-3 freighter. In 1975, Ala14 took over residency, equipped with the Dassault Mirage F1 fighter. In 1991, due to the promotion of Albacete Balompié to the first division, the airport reopened to civilian charter traffic.

Facilities 

The civilian-run maintenance facility La Maestranza Aérea de Albacete is responsible for the modifications and overhaul of some military equipment, including all Dassault Mirage F1 (retired in 2013, replaced by Eurofighter Typhoon), Canadair CL-215 and CASA C-101.

Airlines and destinations 

There are no scheduled services from Albacete Airport. The airport is only served by a number of charter services from carriers such as Privilege Style.

NATO TLP
Since July 2009, the base has been the site of NATO's Tactical Leadership Program, taking over from Belgium's Florennes Air Base.

Accidents

Statistics 

Total Passengers by Year:

References

External links 
 Albacete Airport, official Aena web site
 Albacete Airport at Google Maps
 

Airports in Castilla–La Mancha
1929 establishments in Spain
Airports established in 1929